Lewisetta is an unincorporated village on Travis Point in Northumberland County, Virginia. Lewisetta is located on the tidal Potomac River.  It is also at
the point where the 38th parallel meets the mainland of Virginia.

Historic sites 
Claughton-Wright House, listed on the National Register of Historic Places

Unincorporated communities in Northumberland County, Virginia
Unincorporated communities in Virginia
Virginia populated places on the Potomac River